Terance is a given name. Notable people with the name include:

Terance Mann (born 1996), American basketball player
Terance Mathis (born 1967), American basketball player
Terance Reid (born 1957), South African cricketer

See also
Terence (given name)
Terrance, given name